The 1951 CCCF Championship was played in Panama City, Panama, from 25 February to 4 March. Most member countries did not participate because of a polio epidemic.

Final standings

Statistics

Goalscorers

External links 

CCCF Championship 1951 on RSSSF Archive
Match Details

CCCF Championship
Cccf Championship, 1951
International association football competitions hosted by Panama
Cccf Championship, 1951
CCCF
CCCF
February 1951 sports events in North America
March 1951 sports events in North America
Sports competitions in Panama City
20th century in Panama City